Makrinitsa, nicknamed "balcony of Mt. Pelion," is a village and a former community in Magnesia, Thessaly, Greece. Since the 2011 local government reform it is part of the municipality Volos, of which it is a municipal unit. The municipal unit has an area of 59.903 km2.

Name
The name is first attested in the early 13th century through the Makrinitissa Monastery. "Makrinitissa" itself is a more scholarly form of "Makrinitsa", which must have been the colloquial name even at the time. It is of Slavic origin, originally Mokrinitsa, a diminutive form of Mokrina, "wet place", referring to the water-rich environs of the village. The name was Hellenized with the change of the first vowel to "a" from the Greek word makrys, "long".

Location
It is situated in the northwestern part of the Pelion mountains, 6 km northeast of Volos. One of the most characteristic traditional settlements, full of mansions and houses that look like hanging ornaments on the green mountain side. One of the traditional coffee houses is decorated with a fresco by the famous Greek painter Theofilos. The picturesque cobbled paths of Makrinitsa are scattered with traditional water fountains. Makrinitsa is a popular tourist destination, especially during the winter.

The village is the home of the Museum of Folk Art and History of Pelion, housed in the historic Topali Mansion, with over 1,500 objects related to the folk culture and everyday life of the region.

Historical population

Gallery

References

External links 

All traditional settlements of Greece on Map

Populated places in Pelion
Populated places in Magnesia (regional unit)